On Our Own is an American sitcom that aired on ABC from September 13, 1994 until April 14, 1995. The series stars Ralph Louis Harris and six real life siblings: Jazz, Jocqui, Jake, Jojo, Jurnee, and Jussie Smollett.

The series was created and executive produced by David W. Duclon, one of the executive producers of Family Matters. The series was also produced by Thomas L. Miller and Robert L. Boyett, who developed the show. Suzanne de Passe (who also executive produced Sister, Sister and later Smart Guy) and Suzanne Coston were additional executive producers, with Duclon's longtime colleague Gary Menteer acting as co-executive producer (who also was a producer/writer on Family Matters, to which he returned when On Our Own was canceled).

The series was produced by Miller-Boyett Productions, with associates Lightkeeper Productions (Duclon's company) and de Passe Entertainment. On Our Own was the first Miller-Boyett sitcom to be produced by Warner Bros. Television for its entire run.

Synopsis
The series centers on the Jerrico family, consisting of seven brothers and sisters (all of whom have names that start with "J") in the O'Fallon Park neighborhood of St. Louis who lose their parents and are being raised by the eldest brother, Josh (Harris). The early episodes focused on the siblings attempting to not be split up by authorities. This leads to Josh, the eldest brother who was trying to raise the family alone, to dress in drag and pose as older guardian, Aunt Jelcinda (also known as "Mama J"), to fool their case worker, Alana Michaels (Kimberley Kates). Alana quickly sees through the charade, but decides to help the family stay together. Alana and the family attempt to fool Alana's boss, Mr. Gordon Ormsby (Roger Aaron Brown), that "Mama J" is actually taking care of the family. Problems arise when Mr. Ormsby becomes enamored with "Mama J" and pursues her. Ultimately, "Mama J" tells Mr. Ormsby that she cannot enter into a relationship with him because she is focused on the well being of the children.

The pilot episode also featured Rae'Ven Larrymore Kelly as Hannah, a young neighbor girl and friend of the Jerricos. She was originally slated to be a regular cast member, as she was credited in the opening title sequence (with "and Rae'Ven Kelly as Hannah" appearing last in the cast credit procession), but she did not appear ever again after the prologue segment of the pilot.

In December 1994, the series was put on hiatus and retooled. When it returned to the air in March 1995, Josh was granted full custody of his siblings, thus ending the need for the Aunt Jelcinda/Mama J character. The characters of Alana Michaels and Mr. Ormsby were also written out of the show, and a new character, Scotti Decker (T'Keyah Crystal Keymáh) was introduced. Scotti, a young, attractive professional contractor, rented a room from the Jerricos in exchange for the work she was doing on their home (in her debut episode, rotted beams caused the bathroom tub to crash through the living room ceiling). She became a sister figure to the younger kids, while fighting off sexual advances from Josh and Jimi and turning them into more responsible "men of the house". Suki (Karen Kim) and Nails (Laura Ponce) were the carpenters who worked for Scotti.

Having aired on Sunday nights at 7:30/6:30c during the first half of the season, On Our Own was moved to the 9:30/8:30c time slot following Step by Step on TGIF when it returned in March 1995. The changes to the series in the spring didn't help ratings, and after six more episodes, the show had the plug pulled by ABC.

Cast

Main
Ralph Louis Harris as Josh Jerrico/Aunt Jelcinda ("Mama J")
Jurnee Smollett as Jordee Jerrico
Jussie Smollett as Jesse Jerrico
Jake Smollett as Joc Jerrico
Jazz Smollett as Jai Jerrico
Jocqui Smollett as Jarreau Jerrico
Jojo Smollett as Jimi Jerrico
Kimberley Kates as Alana Michaels (1994)
Roger Aaron Brown as Mr. Gordon Ormsby (1994)
Rae'Ven Larrymore Kelly as Hannah (pilot only)
T'Keyah Crystal Keymáh as Scotti Decker (1995)
Karen Kim as Suki (1995)
Laura Ponce as Nails (1995)

Recurring
Cindy Herron as Shannon
Deon Richmond as Kevin
Bumper Robinson as Nat

Episodes

Syndication
The series was briefly re-aired on TV One in 2007.

Award nominations

References

External links

1990s American black sitcoms
1990s American sitcoms
1994 American television series debuts
1995 American television series endings
American Broadcasting Company original programming
Cross-dressing in television
English-language television shows
Television series about families
Television series about siblings
Television shows set in St. Louis
Television series by Warner Bros. Television Studios
TGIF (TV programming block)